Sandy Maendly (born 4 April 1988) is a Swiss football midfielder, currently playing for Servette Chênois in Swiss Challenge League.  She previously played for AGSM Verona and Torres CF in Italy's Serie A and for YB Frauen and Servette Chênois in Switzerland's Nationalliga A.

She is a member of the Swiss national team.

References

1988 births
Living people
Swiss women's footballers
Expatriate women's footballers in Italy
Switzerland women's international footballers
Serie A (women's football) players
Torres Calcio Femminile players
A.S.D. AGSM Verona F.C. players
FC Neunkirch players
Women's association football forwards
Servette FC Chênois Féminin players
Madrid CFF players
BSC YB Frauen players
UEFA Women's Euro 2022 players
Swiss expatriate women's footballers
Swiss expatriate sportspeople in Italy
Swiss expatriate sportspeople in Spain
Expatriate women's footballers in Spain